Nounkounkan in arabic نونکونکان is a sub-prefecture in Guinea.  Its population is 12,875 according to 2014 census.

History
Nounkounkan was founded by Mankandian Magassouba in the 13th century.

Geography
Nounkounkan is located 628 km from Conakry the capitale of Guinea.

Economy
The feast of the pound in May attracts every year many visitors.

References

Sub-prefectures of the Kankan Region